Bank Street Music Writer is an application for composing and playing music for the Atari 8-bit family, Apple II, Commodore 64 and IBM PC. It was written by Glen Clancy and published by Mindscape. The original Atari version, developed under the name "Note Processor," was released in 1985 and uses the computer's on-board sound chip to produce four-voice music recordings. The Commodore 64 version also uses that system's sound hardware, while the Apple and IBM PC versions require a sound card which was included in the retail box (a clone of the Mockingboard), or alternately use the three-voice sound chip standard with all Tandy and IBM PCjr computers.

Users can input sheet music (up to four voices on the Atari version and six on the PC) with the keyboard and play back the results or print them. The program includes several pre-entered songs, including an excerpt from the Nutcracker Suite and "On Top of Old Smoky", which form the basis of the tutorial.

See also
Bank Street College of Education
Bank Street Writer
Music Construction Set

References

External links

Review: Bank Street Music Writer - Home of the Underdogs
BANK STREET MUSIC WRITER Documentation

Atari 8-bit family software
Apple II software
Commodore 64 software
DOS software
1985 software